Sahar Zakaria (born 19 December 1973) is an Iranian TV and film actress.

Zakaria was born in Arak, Iran.  She got her fame acting in Mehran Modiri's shows and soap operas such as Pavarchin, Marde Dohezar Chehreh, and Ghahve-ye Talkh.

Career
Sahar Zakaria made her acting debut with the series 'Under Your Protection' (1995), before trying her hand at stage acting. She played in the movie 'A Man Made of Glass' (1998).

Sahar has also appeared in movies including 'Boys of the Moonlight (An Army in the Dark)’ (2002), 'The Second Woman' (2007), 'Fatherly Secrets' (2009) and 'Men Are from Mars, Women Are from Venus' (2010). Among the series she has starred in 'Tiptoe' (2002), 'The Man of Two Thousand Faces' (2008), 'Bitter Coffee' (2009), 'The Billionaire' (2012) and 'In Hashieh' (2014-2015) are better-known works.

Filmography
Pavarchin 
Marde Dohezar Chehreh
Ghahveye Talkh
 It Was Not Love

References
Sahar Zakaria on namnak
Sahar Zakaria on beytoote
Sahar Zakaria on aparat

External links

1973 births
Living people
People from Arak, Iran
People from Tehran
Iranian film actresses
Iranian television actresses
20th-century Iranian actresses